The 1984 South Australian Soccer Federation season was the 78th season of soccer in South Australia.

1984 SASF Division One

The 1984 South Australian Division One season was the top level domestic association football competition in South Australia for 1984. It was contested by 12 teams in a 22-round league format, each team playing all of their opponents twice.

League table

1984 Coca Cola Challenge Cup
The 1984 Coca Cola Challenge Cup was a knockout competition, contested by the top four teams from the Division One season.

Bracket

1984 SASF Division Two

The 1984 South Australian Division Two season was the second level domestic association football competition in South Australia for 1984. It was contested by 13 teams in a 26-round league format, each team playing all of their opponents twice.

League table

References

1984 in Australian soccer
Football South Australia seasons